Stephen William Smith is an American biographer, editor, journalist, and writer. He is a former editor of the French daily newspaper Libération and the former deputy editor of the foreign desk at Le Monde. For many years he worked as a traveling correspondent for Radio France International and Reuters News Agency in West and Central Africa.

Biography
Born on October 30, 1956, in Connecticut, Smith studied African law and anthropology at the University of Paris and history, philosophy, and political science at the Free University of Berlin. According to La Vie des Idées, Smith has a PhD in semiotics. After working as a freelance journalist for a few years, Smith joined the staff of Libération in 1986, replacing Pierre Haski as the paper's Africa Editor. In 2000 he became the Africa Editor for Le Monde, becoming deputy director there two years later. In 2005 he left the paper to return to work as a freelance journalist.

Smith is the author of numerous French language books and academic publications related to the anthropology and history of Africa, including books on Burundi, the Democratic Republic of the Congo, Côte d'Ivoire, and Somalia. He has also written a number of biographies on notable African people, including General Mohamed Oufkir (1998), Emperor Jean-Bédel Bokassa (2000), and Winnie Madikizela-Mandela (2007).

Smith is credited with extensively researching the background to the French television miniseries Carlos (2010), about the international terrorist Carlos the Jackal.

Smith is a professor of African studies at Duke University.

His work has been highly criticized by French scholars.

Works 
 La Guerre du cacao with Corinne Moutout and Jean-Louis Gombeaud, Paris, Calmann-Lévy, 1990
 Ces messieurs Afrique with Antoine Glaser, Paris, Calmann-Lévy, Vol. 1, 1992, and Vol. 2, 1997
 Somalie, la guerre perdue de l'humanitaire, Paris, Calmann-Lévy, 1993
 Oufkir, un destin marocain, Paris, Calmann-Lévy, 1999 ; Paris, Hachette Litteratures, 2002
 Bokassa I with Géraldine Faes, Paris, Calmann-Lévy, 2000
 Négrologie : pourquoi l'Afrique meurt, Paris, Calmann-Lévy, 2003
 Le Fleuve Congo, photos by Patrick Robert, Paris, Actes Sud, 2003
 Comment la France a perdu l'Afrique with Antoine Glaser, Paris, Calmann-Lévy, 2005
 Atlas de l'Afrique. Un continent jeune, révolté, marginalisé, Paris, Autrement, 2005
 Noirs et Français ! with Géraldine Faes, Panama, 2006
 Sarko en Afrique with Antoine Glaser, Paris, Plon, 2008
 Voyage en Postcolonie – Le Nouveau Monde franco-africain, Paris, Grasset, 2010
 La ruée vers l'Europe, Paris, Grasset, 2018 (released in English as The Scramble for Europe, Polity, Cambridge, 2019)

References

External links
Biography of Stephen Smith at bibliomonde.net (in French)

Living people
1956 births
American anthropologists
American biographers
American editors
21st-century American historians
21st-century American male writers
American male journalists
Duke University faculty
Free University of Berlin alumni
University of Paris alumni
American male biographers
American male non-fiction writers